William Wallace Wilson (October 26, 1876 – August 20, 1967) was a provincial level politician from Alberta, Canada.

Early life
William Wallace Wilson was born October 26, 1876 in Fergus, Ontario to James Wilson and Jacqueline Gartshore.

Political career
Wilson was an unsuccessful candidate in the 1913 Alberta general election for the Coronation district, losing to Liberal Frank H. Whiteside.
Wilson was elected to the Legislative Assembly of Alberta in the 1917 Alberta general election. He defeated Harry S. Northwood to pick up the vacant Coronation district for the Conservative Party. Wilson only served a single term in office and did not run again when the legislature was dissolved in 1921.

References

External links

Legislative Assembly of Alberta Members Listing

Progressive Conservative Association of Alberta MLAs
1876 births
1967 deaths